Ferdinand Adolf Kehrer (16 February 1837 – 16 June 1914) was a German gynecologist who was a native of Guntersblum in Rhenish Hesse. He was the father of neurologist Ferdinand Adalbert Kehrer (1883–1966).

He studied medicine at the University of Giessen under Ferdinand von Ritgen (1787–1867), at Munich with Karl von Hecker (1827–1882) and in Vienna under Karl von Braun-Fernwald (1822–1891). From 1872 to 1881, he was a "full professor" of obstetrics at the University of Giessen, where he also served as director of the Frauenklinik. In 1881 he relocated to the University of Heidelberg as chair of gynecology.

Kehrer is remembered for performing the first modern Caesarean section. It involved a transverse incision of the lower segment of the uterus, a procedure that minimizes bleeding, and is still widely used today, typically in form of the Pfannenstiel incision, a modification made by Hermann Johannes Pfannenstiel in 1900.

On 25 September 1881, in the town of Meckesheim, he performed the first modern C-section. The patient was a 26-year-old woman, and the operation proved to be a success. Prior to Kehrer's operation, Caesarean sections were seldom performed, and when they were, the mortality rate of mothers was very high. The following year, Max Sanger (1853–1903), introduced the practice of suturing the uterus' Caesarean wound.

He died in Heidelberg.

Selected publications 
 Die Geburten in Schädellagen mit rückwärts gerichtetem Hinterhaupt, (dissertation- Giessen 1860)
 Lehrbuch der Geburtshilfe für Hebammen, (Textbook of midwifery for midwives), 1880 and 1891  
 Ueber den Soorpilz– Pulscurve im Wochenbett, (Heidelberg 1883) 
 Physiologie und Pathologie des Wochenbetts, (Physiology and pathology of the puerperium), in Volumes I and III of P. Müller's Handbuch der Geburtshülfe (1888–89) 
 Lehrbuch der operativen Geburtshilfe, (Textbook of operative obstetrics), 1891.

References

External links
 

This article is based on a translation of an equivalent article in the German Wikipedia.

1837 births
1914 deaths
Academic staff of the University of Giessen
Academic staff of Heidelberg University
German gynaecologists
German obstetricians
People from Rhenish Hesse
People from Mainz-Bingen